Rosana Kiroska (Macedonian: Росана Кироска; born January 22, 1991) is a Macedonian cross-country skier who has competed since 2004. She finished 77th in the 10 km event at the 2010 Winter Olympics in Vancouver.

At the FIS Nordic World Ski Championships 2009 in Liberec, Kiroska finished 83rd in the individual sprint event.

She has three career victories in lesser events up to 5 km from 2007.

References

1991 births
Cross-country skiers at the 2010 Winter Olympics
Living people
Macedonian female cross-country skiers
Olympic cross-country skiers of North Macedonia